Wilson McCandless (June 19, 1810 – June 30, 1882) was a United States district judge of the United States District Court for the Western District of Pennsylvania.

Education and career

Born in Pittsburgh, Pennsylvania, McCandless received a Bachelor of Arts degree from the Western University of Pennsylvania (now known as the University of Pittsburgh) in 1826 and read law to enter the bar in 1831. He was in private practice in Pittsburgh from 1831 to 1859, also serving in the Pennsylvania State Senate.

Federal judicial service

On February 3, 1859, McCandless was nominated by President James Buchanan to a seat on the United States District Court for the Western District of Pennsylvania vacated by Judge Thomas Irwin. McCandless was confirmed by the United States Senate on February 8, 1859, and received his commission the same day. McCandless served in that capacity until his retirement on July 24, 1876.

Later career and death

McCandless then returned to private practice in Pittsburgh from 1876 until his death there on June 30, 1882.

Namesake city

McCandless is the namesake of McCandless, Pennsylvania.

References

Sources

External links
 
 

1810 births
1882 deaths
Judges of the United States District Court for the Western District of Pennsylvania
United States federal judges appointed by James Buchanan
19th-century American judges
University of Pittsburgh alumni
Burials at Allegheny Cemetery
19th-century American politicians
United States federal judges admitted to the practice of law by reading law